HyperCity (styled HyperCITY) was a supermarket chain which operates 20 stores throughout India as of today.
The main area of focus is food, home, and fashion.

History
Founded in 2006, HyperCity Retail India Ltd. was part of the K Raheja Corp, which also owns Shoppers Stop. In 2017, Future Group acquired HyperCity for 655 crore.

HyperCity opened its first store in Malad, Mumbai. Today, a total of 20 stores have been launched, since the company's founding and a presence has been established in cities including Hyderabad, Bangalore, Jaipur, Bhopal, Navi Mumbai, Ahmedabad, Vadodara,  Pune, Delhi-NCR, Panvel, and Thane.

See also
List of hypermarkets in India

References

Indian companies established in 2006
Companies based in Mumbai
Retail companies established in 2006
Supermarkets of India
2006 establishments in Maharashtra
Future Group